This is a list of silicon producers. The industry involves several very different stages of production.  Production starts at silicon metal, which is the  material used to gain high purity silicon. High purity silicon in different grades of purity is used for growing silicon ingots, which are sliced to wafers in a process called wafering. Compositionally pure polycrystalline silicon wafers are useful for photovoltaics. Dislocation-free and extremely flat single-crystal silicon wafers are required in the manufacture of computer chips.

Polysilicon producers
Polysilicon producers:
 Elkem 
 JFE Steel
 Nitol Solar (Russia), bankrupt since 2019
 SunEdison
 SolarWorld

High-purity silicon
Producers of high-purity silicon, an intermediate in the manufacture of polysilicon
 Hemlock Semiconductor Corporation
 Renewable Energy Corporation (REC)
 SunEdison
 Tokuyama Corporation
 Wacker Chemie AG

Silicon wafer manufacturers
A partial list of major producers of wafers (made of high purity silicon, mono- or polycrystalline) includes:
 GlobalWafers
 Okmetic
 Renewable Energy Corporation
 Shin-Etsu Handotai
 Siltronic
 SUMCO

See also
 List of photovoltaics companies

References

Silicon
 

Silicon